Archibald Laidlie (4 December 1727 – 1779) was a clergyman of the Dutch Reformed Church in the United States.

He married Maria Hoffman (1743–1825), sister of State Senator Anthony Hoffman (1739–1790), and they had five children.

References

American Christian clergy
1727 births
1779 deaths
Hoffman family
18th-century American clergy